Craig Scott may refer to:

Craig Scott (golfer) (born 1983), Australian golfer
Craig Scott (singer), 1970s New Zealand pop singer
Craig Scott (politician) (born 1962), Canadian politician

See also